Trifolium lemmonii is a species of clover known by the common name Lemmon's clover.

Distribution
The plant is endemic to the northern Sierra Nevada in eastern California and just into Nevada.

It is a resident of the coniferous forests and sagebrush of the High Sierra.

Some populations are protected within the Plumas National Forest and Tahoe National Forest. It is California Department of Fish and Wildlife and IUCN listed Vulnerable species, and is on the California Native Plant Society Inventory of Rare and Endangered Plants.

Description
Trifolium lemmonii is a perennial herb spreading to form a mat or low clump. Each leaf is made up of 3 to 7 thick oval leaflets. The leaflets are 1 to 2 centimeters long, toothed on the edges, and coated in rough hairs.

The inflorescence is a spherical umbel roughly 2 centimeters wide borne on an erect, arching peduncle. The flowers spread and droop from their attachment. Each has a hairy calyx of sepals with narrow, bristlelike lobes. The flower corolla is pale pink in color and just over a centimeter in length.

References

External links
 Calflora Database: Trifolium lemmonii  (Lemmon's clover)
Jepson Manual eFlora (TJM2) treatment of Trifolium lemmonii
UC CalPhotos gallery: Trifolium lemmonii

lemmonii
Flora of California
Flora of Nevada
Flora of the Sierra Nevada (United States)
Endemic flora of the United States
~
~
Flora without expected TNC conservation status